The Burguete ( or) is a Spanish breed of horse from the autonomous community of Navarre in north-eastern Spain. It is listed in the Catálogo Oficial de Razas de Ganado de España in the group of autochthonous breeds in danger of extinction. It is reared principally for horsemeat.

Name
The name, both in Basque and in Spanish, is derived from that of the municipio of Auritz/Burguete.

History 

The Burguete derives from cross-breeding of indigenous Basque mares of the Jaca Navarra with foreign stallions of Trait Breton, Postier Breton and Percheron breeds, and later with Ardennes and Comtois stock. It received recognition from the national government in 1979, when it was included in the Catálogo Oficial de Razas de Ganado de España.

In 2019 there were 1532 breeding mares and 307 active stallions.

References

Horse breeds
Horse breeds originating in Spain
Basque domestic animal breeds